Blennophis is a genus of clinids found in the southeastern Atlantic ocean.

Species
There are currently two recognized species in this genus:
 Blennophis anguillaris (Valenciennes, 1836) (Snaky klipfish)
 Blennophis striatus (Gilchrist & W. W. Thompson, 1908) (Striped klipfish)

References

 
Clinidae